Victor Lewis (born May 20, 1950) is an American jazz drummer, composer, and educator.

Early life
Victor Lewis was born on May 20, 1950 in Omaha, Nebraska. His father, Richard Lewis, who played saxophone and mother, Camille, a pianist-vocalist were both classically trained musicians who performed with many of the "territory bands" that toured the midwest in the forties. Consequently, Victor grew up with jazz as well as popular and European classical music at home. He would also go with his father to hear touring big bands as they passed through Omaha, such as Duke Ellington, Count Basie and Woody Herman.

Victor started studying music when he was ten and a half years old. Too small for the acoustic bass, he began on cello, but switched to the drums a year and a half later inspired by the drum line marching in holiday parades. As part of his formal studies, he also studied classical piano.

Career
By the time he was 15, Victor began playing drums professionally on the local scene. As one of the few drummers who could read music, he jumped ahead of many of the older musicians for calls on commercial jobs. His big band jazz drumming style was greatly changed after hearing a record of Tony Williams with Miles Davis' Quintet. In addition to Williams, he was greatly influenced by the jazz combo styles of Art Blakey, Kenny Clarke, Max Roach and Philly Joe Jones. He started his own small group to play around town and quickly ascended to playing with nationally known jazz musicians, the first of which was accompanying Hank Crawford in Omaha.

In 1974 Lewis moved to Manhattan, Victor's first gig there was a night at Boomer's with bassist Buster Williams, where he met trumpeter Woody Shaw. Lewis joined the trumpeter's band, becoming a steady member, and a just a few months later he made his recording debut on Shaw's classic, The Moontrane. In the early seventies, the fusion and pop-jazz scenes were becoming popular. Quickly adapting, the drummer was soon recording with Joe Farrell, Earl Klugh, Hubert Laws, Carla Bley and David Sanborn. On his first outing with Sanborn, Lewis recorded his own compositions, "Seventh Avenue" and "Sophisticated Squaw" (a/k/a "Agaya") and later "The Legend of the Cheops."

In 1980, Lewis left Shaw's group to join Stan Getz, in a long collaboration that lasted until the saxophonist's death in 1991. Throughout the eighties, Lewis was one of jazz's busiest freelancers, touring and recording with, among others, Kenny Barron, Art Farmer, J.J. Johnson, Mike Stern, John Stubblefield, Grover Washington Jr., The Manhattan Jazz Quintet, Bobby Hutcherson and Bobby Watson.

As an educator, Lewis has contributed as a freelance instructor with The New School University Jazz School-Mannes Music School Jazz Program in New York City and appears in drum clinics around the world. In 2003 Lewis joined the faculty of Rutgers University in New Brunswick, NJ where he teaches drummers and coaches jazz combos.

In the press, there have been several feature articles about him in publications such as Downbeat, The Wire, Jazz Times as well as Modern Drummer.

Discography

As leader
 1992: Family Portrait (AudioQuest) with John Stubblefield, Edward Simon, Cecil McBee, Don Alias, Jumma Santos
 1992: Know It Today, Know It Tomorrow (Red) with Eddie Henderson, Edward Simon, Christian McBride, Seamus Blake
 1997: Eeeyyess!! (Enja) with Seamus Blake, Terell Stafford, Stephen Scott, Ed Howard (Enja)
 1998: Three Way Conversations (Red) with Seamus Blake, Steve Wilson, Terell Stafford

As sideman
With John Abercrombie, Arthur Blythe, and Jeff Palmer
 Ease On (AudioQuest, 1993)
With George Adams
Nightingale (Blue Note, 1989)
With Don Alias
 Grey (Quinton, 2001)
With Franco Ambrosetti
Live at the Blue Note (Enja, 1993) 
With Kenny Barron
 What If? (Enja, 1986)
 Live at Fat Tuesdays (Enja, 1988)
 Quickstep (Enja, 1991)
 The Moment (Reservoir, 1991)
 Other Places (Verve, 1993)
 Sambao (Gitanes/EmArcy, 1992)
 Things Unseen (Verve, 1997)
With Gary Bartz
 Shadows (Timeless, 1991)
With Roni Ben-Hur and Nilson Matta
 Mojave (Motéma, 2011)
With Andy Bey
 Shades of Bey (12th Street/Evidence, 1998)
 Tuesdays in Chinatown (12th Street/N2K Encoded Music, 2001)
With Carla Bley
 Heavy Heart (Watt, 1983)
 Night-Glo (Watt, 1985)
 Sextet (Watt, 1987)
 The Very Big Carla Bley Band (Watt, 1991)
 4 x 4 (Watt, 2000)
 Live in Montreal (DVD-V, Universal, 2003)
With Paul Bley
 Speachless (SteepleChase, 1995)
 Reality Check (SteepleChase, 1996)
With Anthony Braxton
 Seven Standards 1985, Vol. 1 & 2 (Magenta, 1985 & 1986)
With George Cables
Senorita de Aranjuez (Meldec Jazz, 2001)
Looking for the Light (MuseFX, 2003)
A Letter to Dexter (Kind of Blue, 2006)
My Muse (HighNote, 2012)
Icons & Influences (HighNote, 2014)
In Good Company (HighNote, 2015)
The George Cables Songbook (HighNote, 2016)
With James Carter
 Gardenias for Lady Day (Columbia, 2003)
 Present Tense (EmArcy, 2008)
With Cyrus Chestnut
A Million Colors in Your Mind (HighNote, 2015)
With Marc Copland
 Crosstalk (Pirouet, 2011)
With Eddie "Lockjaw" Davis
 The Heavy Hitter (Muse, 1979)
With Art Farmer
 Blame It on My Youth (Contemporary, 1988)
With Barry Finnerty
 Straight Ahead (Arabesque, 1994)
With Stan Getz
 The Dolphin (Concord Jazz, 1981)
 Spring Is Here (Concord Jazz, 1981 [1992])
 Billy Highstreet Samba (EmArcy, 1981 [1990])
 Pure Getz (Concord Jazz, 1982)
 Stan Getz Quartet Live in Paris (Dreyfus Jazz, 1982 [1996])
 Line for Lyons with Chet Baker (Sonet, 1983)
 The Stockholm Concert (Sonet, 1983 [1989])
 Voyage (BlackHawk, 1986)
 Anniversary! (EmArcy, 1987 [1989])
 Serenity (EmArcy, 1987 [1991])
With Dexter Gordon
 Sophisticated Giant (Columbia, 1977)
With G.org featuring Randy Brecker and Chuck Loeb
 A New Kind of Blue (A Nest of Eggs, 2004)
With Steve Grossman
 Perspective (Atlantic, 1979)
With Mark Helias
 The Current Set (Enja, 1987)
With John Hicks
 Naima's Love Song featuring Bobby Watson (DIW, 1988)
 East Side Blues (DIW, 1988)
 Lover Man: A Tribute to Billie Holiday (Red Baron, 1993)
 Cry Me a River (Venus, 1997)
With Bobby Hutcherson
 Cruisin' the 'Bird (Landmark, 1988)
With J. J. Johnson
 Standards (EmArcy, 1991)
 Heroes (Verve, 1998)
With Jonny King
Above All (Sunnyside, 2010 [2012])
With Oliver Lake
 Heavy Spirits (Freedom/Arista, 1975)
With the Hubert Laws Group
 A Hero Ain't Nothin' but a Sandwich (Original Motion Picture Soundtrack) (Columbia, 1978)
With Dave Liebman
 Setting the Standard  (Red, 1993)
With Abbey Lincoln
 A Turtle's Dream (Gitanes/Verve, 1994)
With Carmen Lundy
 Good Morning Kiss (BlackHawk, 1986)
 This Is Carmen Lundy (Afrasia, 2001)
 Something to Believe In (Justin Time, 2003)
 Jazz and the New Songbook: Live at the Madrid (Afrasia, 2005)
 Night and Day (Afrasia, 2011)
With Charles McPherson
First Flight Out (Araesque, 1994)
Manhattan Nocturne (Arabesque, 1998)
With Helen Merrill
 Brownie: Homage to Clifford Brown (Verve, 1994)
With Karlheinz Miklin
 Next Page (1991)
With Ralph Moore
Furthermore (Landmark, 1990)
With David Murray
 Lucky Four (Tutu, 1988)
 MX (Red Baron, 1992)
With New York Rhythm Machine
 Blues March: Portrait of Art Blakey (Venus, 1992)
 Moanin': Portrait of Art Blakey (Venus, 1992)
With Judy Niemack
Blue Nights (BluJazz, 2007) featuring Jeanfrançois Prins, Gary Bartz, Jim McNeely
With Jeanfrançois Prins
El Gaucho (Challenge Records, 2012) featuring Rich Perry
With Charlie Rouse
Soul Mates (Uptown, 1988 [1993]) featuring Sahib Shihab
With George Russell's New York Band
 Live in an American Time Spiral (Soul Note, 1982)
With Joe Sample
 Invitation (1993)
With David Sanborn
 David Sanborn (Warner Bros., 1976)
 Promise Me the Moon (Warner Bros., 1977)
With Woody Shaw
 The Moontrane (Muse, 1975)
 Love Dance (Muse, 1975)
 The Iron Men (Muse, 1977, released 1980)
 Rosewood (Columbia, 1977)
 Stepping Stones: Live at the Village Vanguard (Columbia, 1978)
 Woody III (Columbia, 1979)
 For Sure! (Columbia, 1980)
With Lew Soloff
 With a Song in My Heart (Milestone, 1998)
With John Stubblefield
 Bushman Song (Enja, 1986)
 Countin' on the Blues (Enja, 1987)
With Charles Sullivan
Kamau (Arabesque, 1995)
With Steve Swallow
 Carla (Xtra Watt, 1987)
With Harvie Swartz
 Urban Earth (Gramavision, 1985)
 Smart Moves (Gramavision, 1986)
With Lew Tabackin
 Desert Lady (Concord, 1989)
With Charles Tolliver
 With Love (2007)
With Steve Turre
 Rhythm Within (Antilles, 1995)
 Steve Turre (Verve, 1997)
 TNT (Trombone-n-Tenor) (Telarc, 2001)
With Tom Varner
 Jazz French Horn (Soul Note, 1985)
With Jack Walrath
 Journey, Man! (Evidence 1995)
With Cedar Walton
 Composer (Astor Place, 1996)
With Bobby Watson & Horizon
 No Question About It (Blue Note, 1988)
 Post-Motown Bop (Blue Note, 1990)
 The Inventor (Blue Note, 1990)
 Present Tense (Columbia, 1992)
 Midwest Shuffle (Columbia, 1994)
With Randy Weston
 Khepera (Verve, 2000)
With Larry Willis
Let's Play (SteepleChase, 1991)

References

Further reading
 Ineck, Tom (November 4, 1993). "Jazz drummer Victor Lewis remembers his days at UNL". Lincoln Journal Star. p. 13

External links
 Victor Lewis biography, discography and album reviews, credits & releases at AllMusic
 Wayne Shorter discography, album releases & credits at Discogs
 

1950 births
Living people
musicians from Omaha, Nebraska
American jazz drummers
Enja Records artists
20th-century American drummers
American male drummers
20th-century American male musicians
American male jazz musicians
Manhattan Jazz Quintet members
University of Nebraska–Lincoln alumni